The 2017 Viterra Championship, Manitoba's provincial men's curling championship, was held from February 8 to 12 at the Stride Place in Portage la Priarie. The winning team represented Manitoba at the 2017 Tim Hortons Brier in St. John's, Newfoundland and Labrador.

Teams
Teams are as follows:

Draw
32 team double knockout with playoff round
Four teams qualify each from A Event and B Event

A Event

B Event

Playoffs

Playoff round
8 team double knockout
Four teams qualify into Championship Round

Championship round

1 vs. 2
Saturday, February 11, 6:00 pm

3 vs. 4
Saturday, February 11, 6:00 pm

Semifinal
Sunday, February 12, 9:00 am

Final
Sunday, February 12, 3:00 pm

References

2017 Tim Hortons Brier
Sport in Portage la Prairie
Curling in Manitoba
2017 in Manitoba
February 2017 sports events in Canada